Le Boulevard périphérique is a Belgian novel by Henry Bauchau. It was first published in 2008. It won the Prix du Livre Inter and was short-listed for the Prix France Culture-Télérama in 2008.

References

Editions 
 Le Boulevard périphérique, Actes Sud, 2008 .

2008 Belgian novels
French-language novels